Dalrigh is a hamlet in Scotland near Tyndrum.  The name means "The King's Field" in Scottish Gaelic.

The origin of the name stems specifically from the Battle of Dalrigh which was fought there in 1306, when King Robert I of Scotland (Bruce) was defeated by the Clan MacDougall.

Hamlets in Stirling (council area)